Year 1227 (MCCXXVII) was a common year starting on Friday (link will display the full calendar) of the Julian calendar.

Events 
 By place 

 Europe 
 Spring – Livonian Crusade: The Livonian Brothers of the Sword and their Crusader allies (some 20,000 men) cross the sea ice from mainland Estonia, and defeat the last Estonian strongholds in the Battle of Muhu and the siege of the Valjala Stronghold in the Saaremaa islands. This marks the end of the Estonian campaign in the Livonian Crusade. The Sword Brothers conquer Danish Estonia, and Tallinn is given town rights under Riga law.
 July 22 – Battle of Bornhöved: Count Adolf IV of Holstein – leading a coalition army from the cities of Lübeck and Hamburg, defeats the Danish-German forces of King Valdemar II, and the Welf nobleman Otto I (the Child). Adolf shakes off Danish supremacy and accepts an overlordship by the Archbishopric of Bremen under Archbishop Gerhard II of Lippe. Adolf expands his power and establishes new frontiers within the Holy Roman Empire.
 July 28 – Battle of Ane: Forces of the Bishopric of Utrecht are defeated by the rebellious Drenths led by Rudolph van Coevorden near Ane (modern Netherlands). The Drenths lure the Bishop's forces, supported by heavily armoured knights, in an ambush into a swampy area and kill Bishop Otto II of Lippe. After the battle, Otto's successor, Wilbrand van Oldenburg, rouses the Frisian people into supporting the war against the Drenths.
 August – Emperor Frederick II musters a German expeditionary force in Apulia. The crowded conditions and high heat contribute to discontent and disease among the assembled troops. On September 24, an epidemic of malaria enfeebles the army at Brindisi. Several thousand Crusaders led by Henry IV, duke of Limburg, and French and English mercenaries under the bishops Peter des Roches and William Briwere, arrive at Acre.  
 September – A second contingent joined by Frederick II, departs from Brindisi to the Levant. On September 11, during the second day of the voyage, one of Fredericks' companions, Louis IV of Thuringia, dies of an illness (possibly cholera) at Otranto. Frederick also becomes sick and decides to return home, while sending the rest of the Crusader fleet (20 galleys) to Acre. There, they fortify the coastal towns of Caesarea and Jaffa.
 October 10 – Frederick II recovering at Pozzuoli, receives a letter from Pope Gregory IX, announcing his ex-communication. Frederick is branded a wanton violator of his sacred oath taken many times, at Aachen, Ferentino, Veroli and San Germano. Meanwhile, the Crusader army fortifies Sidon Sea Castle and rebuilds Montfort Castle, northeast of Acre, as a new headquarter castle for the Teutonic Knights, who called it Starkenburg.
 Swedish-Novgorodian War: Grand Prince Yaroslav II of Vladimir leads an attack from the Novgorod Republic on Baltic Finnic peoples in eastern Fennoscandia, called "Yem", whom he devastates.
 November 24 – Prince Leszek I (the White) is assassinated in an ambush on a council of Polish dukes in the city of Gąsawa, an event which later becomes known as the Gąsawa Massacre.

 Mongol Empire 
 Autumn – Prince Tolui, Mongol regent and youngest son of Genghis Khan, assembles a Kurultai in the homelands of Mongolia. He persuades the chieftains of the clan to carry out Genghis' wishes. Ögedei Khan receives the Great Khanate. Genghis' eldest son, Jochi, dies before him, and his lands are divided between his two sons Batu Khan and Orda Khan, who rule the Western provinces (the Golden Horde and White Horde). Genghis' second son, Chagatai Khan, inherits the former Uigur and Kara-Khanid Khanate (now called the Chagatai Khanate). Tolui receives the Mongol homelands.

 Levant 
 November 12 – Al-Mu'azzam Isa, Ayyubid ruler of Damascus, dies after a 11-year reign. He is succeeded by his 21-year-old son, An-Nasir Dawud, who faces opposition from his uncle, Sultan Al-Kamil of Egypt.

 England 
 Spring – The 19-year-old Henry III assumes control of the government. He appoints Hubert de Burgh as Governor of Rochester Castle and rewards him with the title Earl of Kent.

 Asia 
 Siege of Yinchuan: Mongol forces eliminate the Western Xia (or Xi Xia) and execute Emperor Mo (or Li Xian). Genghis Khan dies during the siege under debated circumstances, but this is kept secret from the army until the siege's end. Yinchuan is pillaged and its entire population is slaughtered or sold into slavery. Genghis orders the imperial family to be executed, effectively ending the Tangut royal lineage.
 August 18 – Genghis Khan dies during the fall of Yinchuan after a 21-year reign. His exact cause of death remains a mystery, and is variously attributed to being killed in action against the Western Xia, illness, falling from his horse, or wounds sustained during hunting. Genghis is succeeded by his third son, Ögedei Khan, who becomes the "Great Khan" of the Mongol Empire.

 By topic 

 Cities and Towns 
 January 11 – The city of Požga in Croatia is first mentioned, in a charter of King Andrew II of Hungary.
 Northleach in the Cotswolds, U.K. is granted a charter by King Henry III.

 Religion 
 Dōgen Zenji receives Dharma transmission and inka from his master Rujing in China, settling his "life's quest of the great matter", going on to introduce Sōtō Zen Buddhism into his native Japan.
 March 18 – Pope Honorius III dies at Rome after a pontificate of nearly 11 year. He is succeeded by Gregory IX as the 178th pope of the Catholic Church.
 September 29 – Gregory IX excommunicates Frederick II, due to his broken promises and delay of the Sixth Crusade.

Births 
 January 1 – Mujū Dōkyō, Japanese Buddhist monk (d. 1312)
 June 29 – Hōjō Tokiyori, Japanese regent (shikken) (d. 1263)
 September 30 – Nicholas IV, pope of the Catholic Church (d. 1292)
 Aju (or Achu), Mongol military leader and chancellor (d. 1287)
 Chomden Rigpe Raldri, Tibetan scholar and writer (d. 1305)
 Elisabeth of Bavaria, queen consort of Germany (d. 1273)
 Fang Hui (or Xugu), Chinese scholar and politician (d. 1307)
 Gertrude of Aldenberg, German noblewoman (d. 1297)
 Hōjō Nagatoki, Japanese samurai and regent (d. 1264)
 Hu Zhiyu, Chinese Sanqu poet and writer (d. 1293)
 William II of Holland, anti-king of Germany (d. 1256)

Deaths 
 January 28 – Henry Borwin I, German nobleman and knight
 March 18 – Honorius III, pope of the Catholic Church (b. 1150)
 April 28 – Henry V (the Elder), German nobleman (b. 1173)
 July 23 – Qiu Chuji, Chinese Taoist religious leader (b. 1148)
 July 28 – Otto II of Lippe (or Utrecht), Dutch prince-bishop 
 August 1 – Shimazu Tadahisa, Japanese warlord (b. 1179)
 August 18 – Genghis Khan, founder of the Mongol Empire
 September 11 
 Louis IV (the Saint), landgrave of Thuringia (b. 1200)
 Oliver of Paderborn, German bishop and chronicler
 September 13 – Guillaume II, French nobleman and knight
 September 29 – Conrad of Urach, German cardinal-bishop
 October 4 – Abdallah al-Adil, Almohad governor and caliph
 October 10 – Daniel and companions, Franciscan martyrs
 November 12 – Al-Mu'azzam Isa, Ayyubid ruler (b. 1176)
 November 24 – Leszek I (the White), High Duke of Poland 
 Abd al-Salam ibn Mashish al-Alami, Moroccan Sufi writer
 Guala Bicchieri, Italian cardinal and papal legate (b. 1150)
 Jochi, Mongol general and son of Genghis Khan (b. 1182)
 Luke Netterville, Norman archdeacon and archbishop
 Minamoto no Michitomo, Japanese nobleman (b. 1171)
 Mo (or Li Xian), Chinese emperor of Western Xia
 Philip of Ibelin, Cypriot nobleman and regent (b. 1180)
 Renaud I (or Reginald), French nobleman (b. 1165)
 Shalva of Akhaltsikhe, Georgian general and courtier

References